Henry Nicholas Cullop (October 16, 1900 – December 8, 1978) was an American outfielder in Major League Baseball during the 1920s and 1930s. Cullop was better known, however, as a feared batsman in minor league baseball and as a longtime manager at the minor league level. He is the all-time minor league RBI king. Cullop was nicknamed "Tomato Face" because his face turned bright red whenever he got angry. He is not related to pitcher Nick Cullop.

Biography
Although he was primarily an outfielder, Cullop continued to pitch sporadically through , compiling a 49–50 record in 140 minor league games.

However, Cullop made his name as a batter. In , he swatted 40 home runs and compiled 155 runs batted in with the Omaha Buffaloes of the Class A Western League; the following season, he led the Southern Association with 30 home runs as a member of the Atlanta Crackers. His prodigious hitting led to major league trials with the New York Yankees, Washington Senators, Cleveland Indians, Brooklyn Robins and Cincinnati Reds (–1927; –1931). In 173 games over all or parts of those seasons, Cullop batted only .249 with 122 hits, 29 doubles, 12 triples, 11 home runs and 67 RBI.

But at the minor league level, he was a terror. Cullop's best season was in 1930 with the Minneapolis Millers of the American Association. He batted .359 and led the Association in runs scored (150), homers (54) and RBI (152). He played through , and overall he batted .312, made 2,670 hits, slugged 420 homers and drove in 1,857 RBI in 2,484 minor league games.

Cullop died at age 78 in Westerville, Ohio.

References
Johnson, Lloyd, ed., The Minor League Register. Durham, North Carolina: Baseball America, 1994.
Johnson, Lloyd, and Wolff, Miles, ed., The Encyclopedia of Minor League Baseball, 1997 edition. Durham, North Carolina: Baseball America.
Reichler, Joseph, ed.,  The Baseball Encyclopedia.  New York: Macmillan Publishing Co., 1979.

External links

Interview with Nick Cullop conducted by Eugene Murdock on August 31, 1974, in Columbus, Ohio: Part 1, Part 2

1900 births
1978 deaths
Asheville Tourists managers
Asheville Tourists players
Atlanta Crackers players
Baltimore Orioles (IL) managers
Baseball players from Missouri
Brooklyn Robins players
Buffalo Bisons (minor league) players
Cincinnati Reds players
Cleveland Indians players
Columbus Red Birds players
Des Moines Boosters players
Houston Buffaloes players
Madison Greys players
Major League Baseball outfielders
Milwaukee Brewers (minor league) managers
Minneapolis Millers (baseball) players
Minor league baseball managers
New York Yankees players
Omaha Buffaloes players
People from St. Charles County, Missouri
Pocatello Cardinals players
Rochester Red Wings players
Sacramento Solons players
St. Joseph Saints players
St. Paul Saints (AA) players
Washington Senators (1901–1960) players